Ryparosa is a genus of plants in the family Achariaceae.

Its native range stretches from Indo-China to north-eastern Australia. It is found in Andaman Is., Borneo, Jawa, Lesser Sunda Is., Malaya, Myanmar, New Guinea, Nicobar Is., Philippines, Queensland (state in Australia), Sumatera, Thailand and Vietnam.

It was first described and published in Bijdr. Fl. Ned. Ind. on page 600 in 1826.

Known species
According to Kew;

References

 
Malpighiales genera
Taxonomy articles created by Polbot
Plants described in 1826
Flora of Indo-China
Flora of Malesia
Flora of Papuasia
Flora of Queensland